Chrysopsis subulata, called the scrubland goldenaster,  is a North American species of flowering plant in the family Asteraceae. It has been found only in Florida.

Chrysopsis subulata is a biennial herb up to 70 cm (28 inches) tall. It generally produces 1-5 branching stems. Both the leaves and the stem are either hairless or with finely scattered hairs. Each stalk can produce as many as 70 yellow flower heads and a loose array. The species grows in sandy and grassy locations.

References

subulata
Endemic flora of Florida
Plants described in 1933
Taxa named by John Kunkel Small